Volodymyr Oleksandrovych Sinkler or Vladimir Sinclair (12 January 1879 — 16 March 1946) was a Ukrainian military leader, general of the Russian army, and general of the Ukrainian People's Army.

Volodymyr Sinclair was born in the city of Margilan (present-day Uzbekistan) the former city of Kokand Khanate. Margilan became the uyezd center of the newly established Fergana Oblast in the Russian Turkestan around 1875. Sinclair family were of the Swedish descent that left the Great Britain after the Glorious Revolution of 1688 and pledged allegiance to Alexis of Russia. Sinclair's father was a military engineer.

Volodymyr studied at the Nepliuyevsky cadet corps and later at Mikhailov Artillery Academy in Orenburg, Russia. After short service at the head of an artillery detachment went to study at the prestigious Artillery Academy of the General Staff along with Oleksander Hrekov with whom he joined the General Staff (General Bulawa) of the Ukrainian People's Army. After graduation with distinction went to serve at different positions in St.Petersburg — served as staff officer and aide-de-camp. Throughout his career Sinclair mostly served as a staff-officer.

During World War I first served as regimental Chief of Staff and later commanded a Russian infantry regiment. Awarded the title of major-general, and the Order of Saint Stanislaus, 2nd and 3rd class; the Order of St. Anne, 2nd and 3rd class; the Order of St. Vladimir, 3rd and 4th class with swords.

After the October Revolution went to serve in the General Staff of the Ukrainian People's Army (UNR). In 1918 was promoted to Quartermaster General. During the Hetmanate and the Directorate he continued to serve in the General Staff, playing an important role in capture of Kiev from Bolsheviks in 1919. At the end of 1919 became Chief of General Staff. In 1920 headed Ukrainian delegation in negotiations with Poland, which resulted in the Treaty of Warsaw.

After the military defeat of the Army of UNR retired and settled in Eastern Poland, participated in the life of the local Ukrainian community. At the end of Second World War with the advance of the Red Army was arrested by NKVD and interned to Kiev. Died in Lukyanivska Prison.

References

1879 births
1946 deaths
People from Margilan
People from Fergana Oblast
Russian military personnel of World War I
Ukrainian people of World War I
Ukrainian generals
People from the Russian Empire of Swedish descent
Ukrainian people in the Russian Empire
Ukrainian military leaders
Ukrainian people who died in Soviet detention
Inmates of Lukyanivska Prison
Recipients of the Order of St. Anna, 2nd class
Recipients of the Order of St. Anna, 3rd class
Recipients of the Order of St. Anna, 4th class